"Are You Dreaming?" is a song by Dutch group Twenty 4 Seven, released in November 1990 as the second single from their first album, Street Moves (1991). Nancy Coolen performed the vocal parts, and Captain Hollywood the rap parts—with Fixx it & Janks. The song was a top 10 hit in Denmark, Finland, Italy and Switzerland. In the UK, it reached number 17.

Critical reception
British magazine Music Week described the song as a "pop-rap galloper". David Quantick from NME wrote, "I wish I was called Captain Hollywood. This is shamelessly happy Euro pop rap and keeps threatening to turn into Modern Romance's 'The Best Years Of Our Lives'. Ay ay ay ay, it's a new romance. Ay ay ay ay, it makes me want to dance."

Track listing

 Vinyl 7", Netherlands
 "Are You Dreaming?" (Radio Edit) — 2:45 	
 "Are You Dreaming?" (Instrumental Edit) — 3:18

 Vinyl 12", Italy
 "Are You Dreaming?" (Radio Edit) — 2:45 	
 "Are You Dreaming?" (Dream Dub) — 4:24
 "Are You Dreaming?" (Nightmare Mix) — 5:08 	
 "Are You Dreaming?" (Acapella) — 4:24

 CD maxi, UK 
 "Are You Dreaming?" (Radio Edit) — 2:45 	
 "Are You Dreaming?" (Bruce Forest Radio Edit) — 4:01 	
 "Are You Dreaming?" (Bruce Forest Remix) — 6:53 	
 "Are You Dreaming?" (Nightmare Mix) — 5:08 	

 CD maxi, Germany
 "Are You Dreaming?" (Radio Edit) — 2:45 	
 "Are You Dreaming?" (Nightmare Mix) — 5:08 	
 "Are You Dreaming?" (Acapella) — 4:24 	
 "Are You Dreaming?" (Dream Dub) — 4:24

 CD maxi, Scandinavia 
 "Are You Dreaming?" (Radio Edit) — 2:45 	
 "Are You Dreaming?" (Nightmare Mix) — 5:08 	
 "Are You Dreaming?" (Acapella) — 4:24 	
 "Are You Dreaming?" (Dream Dub) — 4:24

Charts

Weekly charts

Year-end charts

References

1990 singles
1990 songs
Twenty 4 Seven songs
Songs written by Tony Dawson-Harrison
Songs written by Ruud van Rijen